The 2009 MAAC men's basketball tournament was an NCAA college basketball tournament held at the Times Union Center in Albany, New York on March 6–9, 2009, to decide the Metro Atlantic Athletic Conference champion. The winner, Siena advanced to the 2009 NCAA Men's Division I Basketball Tournament, a 65-team event to decide the national champion of Division I college basketball. Siena received a No. 9 seed and upset No. 8 seed Ohio State 74–72 in double overtime, then were defeated by No. 1 seed Louisville 72–79 in the second round.

Seeds
All 10 teams in the conference participated in the Tournament. The top six teams received byes to the quarterfinals. Teams were seeded by record within the conference, with a tiebreaker system to seed teams with identical conference records.

Schedule

Bracket

2008–09 Metro Atlantic Athletic Conference men's basketball season
MAAC men's basketball tournament
College basketball tournaments in New York (state)
Basketball competitions in Albany, New York
MAAC men's basketball tournament
MAAC men's basketball tournament